Karlo Kuret (born 28 February 1970) is a Croatian sailor. He competed at the 1992, 1996, 2000, and the 2004 Summer Olympics.

References

External links
 

1970 births
Living people
Croatian male sailors (sport)
Olympic sailors of Croatia
Sailors at the 1992 Summer Olympics – Finn
Sailors at the 1996 Summer Olympics – Finn
Sailors at the 2000 Summer Olympics – Finn
Sailors at the 2004 Summer Olympics – Finn
Sportspeople from Split, Croatia